The 1991 CCHA Men's Ice Hockey Tournament was the 20th CCHA Men's Ice Hockey Tournament. It was played between March 1 and March 9, 1991. First round games were played at campus sites, while 'final four' games were played at Joe Louis Arena in Detroit, Michigan. By winning the tournament, Lake Superior State received the Central Collegiate Hockey Association's automatic bid to the 1991 NCAA Division I Men's Ice Hockey Tournament.

Format
The tournament featured three rounds of play. The team that finished below eighth place in the standings was not eligible for postseason play. In the quarterfinals, the first and eighth seeds, the second and seventh seeds, the third seed and sixth seeds and the fourth seed and fifth seeds played a best-of-three series, with the winners advancing to the semifinals. In the semifinals, the remaining highest and lowest seeds and second highest and second lowest seeds play a single-game, with the winners advancing to the finals. The tournament champion receives an automatic bid to the 1991 NCAA Division I Men's Ice Hockey Tournament.

Conference standings
Note: GP = Games played; W = Wins; L = Losses; T = Ties; PTS = Points; GF = Goals For; GA = Goals Against

Bracket

Note: * denotes overtime period(s)

First round

(1) Lake Superior State vs. (8) Illinois–Chicago

(2) Michigan vs. (7) Ohio State

(3) Ferris State vs. (6) Bowling Green

(4) Western Michigan vs. (5) Michigan State

Semifinals

(1) Lake Superior State vs. (4) Western Michigan

(2) Michigan vs. (3) Ferris State

Consolation Game

(3) Ferris State vs. (4) Western Michigan

Championship

(1) Lake Superior State vs. (2) Michigan

Tournament awards

All-Tournament Team
F Mike Eastwood (Western Michigan)
F Doug Weight (Lake Superior State)
F Don Stone (Michigan)
D Aaron Ward (Michigan)
D Karl Johnston (Lake Superior State)
G Darrin Madeley (Lake Superior State)

MVP
 Clayton Beddoes (Lake Superior State)

References

External links
 CCHA Champions
 1990–91 CCHA Standings
 1990–91 NCAA Standings

CCHA Men's Ice Hockey Tournament
Ccha tournament